Grunt: The Curious Science of Humans at War is a nonfiction work by Mary Roach, published in June 2016 by W. W. Norton & Company. The book covers the subject of scientific research for the military and some of the less well-known aspects of the lives of soldiers. Instead of focusing on the science that can kill (guns, bombs, drones), Roach looks at the science of saving lives and improving the quality of a soldier's experience. In this book, Roach attempts to answer many questions about the military that the reader may not have thought of before and discusses the challenges that soldiers have to face on the battlefield that do not necessarily directly involve fighting.
It has been described as "both entertaining and informative in the best tradition of science writing".

References

External links 
 Grunt on Mary Roach's website
 Grunt book page on the publisher's (W.W. Norton & Company) website

Books about the military
2016 non-fiction books
W. W. Norton & Company books